The Legend of Zelda: Phantom Hourglass is a 2007 action-adventure game developed and published by Nintendo for the Nintendo DS handheld game console. It is the fourteenth installment in The Legend of Zelda series and the direct sequel to the 2002 GameCube title The Wind Waker. Phantom Hourglass was released worldwide in 2007, with the exception of South Korea in April 2008. The game was re-released for the Wii U via the Virtual Console service in the PAL region in November 2015, in North America in May 2016, and in Japan in August. It earned a sequel, The Legend of Zelda: Spirit Tracks in December 2009.

The game features 3D cel-shaded graphics with an overhead camera perspective, employs controls involving the console's touchscreen and microphone, and took advantage of the Nintendo Wi-Fi Connection for online play until the service was discontinued in 2014. The game's story follows that of The Wind Waker, focusing on series protagonist Link's journey to save his friend Tetra from the story's antagonist, Bellum, with the help of Captain Linebeck and his ship, the S.S. Linebeck.

Critics were highly positive towards Phantom Hourglass. Its control scheme was praised, while criticism focused on its online features, which were considered too simple. The game received several video game industry awards, including the Nintendo DS Game of the Year award from GameSpot, GameSpy, and IGN. Phantom Hourglass was the best-selling game in its first month in Japan, with 302,887 copies sold. In the United States, it was the fifth best-selling game in the month it debuted, with 262,800 copies sold. 4.13 million copies of Phantom Hourglass were sold worldwide by March 2008.

Gameplay

The Legend of Zelda: Phantom Hourglass is an action-adventure game with gameplay similar to the other games in The Legend of Zelda series. The player controls Link, the protagonist, and explores the world to find new items, information, and allies to help him save his friend Tetra and defeat the antagonist Bellum. The game is divided into two gameplay types: sailing between islands, and exploring the islands and their dungeons on foot. While on land, Link discovers and utilizes many items, including the classic boomerang, bow, and bombs. When sailing, the game shows a map of the area on the Nintendo DS's top screen, and a 3D top-down view of Link and his nearby surroundings on the lower touchscreen. The player can bring down the map from the top screen to the lower screen to make notes. During certain events, including most boss battles, a 3D view is shown on both screens, allowing the player to have a wider view of their surroundings. The player controls Link with the stylus, moves him by pointing to the sides of the screen, and uses the stylus to interact with objects and people or attack foes by pointing at them. To travel between islands on the Great Sea, the player controls a paddle steamer called the S.S. Linebeck. The player can plot a course by drawing on a sea chart, redraw the course to make any necessary alterations, shoot at enemies that attack the ship using a cannon, and jump to avoid obstacles.

The game includes a one-on-one multiplayer battle mode. In an arena, one player controls Link, while the other player, on defense, controls three Phantom Guardians. Players of both sides are aided by power-up items that appear on the playing field. Link's goal is to grab a Force Gem and carry it to his base. The other player, controlling the three Phantom Guardians, must find and catch Link before he returns any Force Gems. When Link is caught, or if the round is over, players switch sides. Each multiplayer game consists of three rounds, and in each round, each player takes a turn at both sides. The maximum length of a multiplayer game is 12 minutes, assuming Link does not get caught. The game supports multiplayer both locally and online through the Nintendo Wi-Fi Connection, as well as Download Play. The game is the third The Legend of Zelda game to include multiplayer, following Four Swords and Four Swords Adventures.

Phantom Hourglass introduces the game mechanic of a large dungeon central to the game's story, in this case the Temple of the Ocean King. Link visits the Temple multiple times during the course of the game's story, in order to obtain sea charts that allow him to sail to other parts of the ocean. Throughout the game, the Temple has a curse placed on it that drains Link's life whenever he is inside, but upon obtaining the Phantom Hourglass, Link is able to explore the Temple without being affected by the curse for a limited amount of time. In addition to the curse, Link must contend with Phantoms, a type of enemy exclusive to the Temple. Phantoms are invincible for the most part, necessitating the use of stealth in order to get past them. "Safe zones" are scattered throughout the Temple, and allow Link to avoid both the Phantoms and the Temple's curse. As Link progresses through the game, he is able to access deeper levels of the Temple and stay inside for longer. The Temple, including the puzzles within, will reset whenever Link leaves, but as he obtains new items, he can unlock new routes and shortcuts that enable him to travel through the Temple quicker. All this is done similarly to a dungeon crawler.

Plot

Taking place immediately after The Wind Waker, in which Link defeats Ganondorf who turns to stone and remains at the bottom of a now sealed away Hyrule, Link and Tetra travel over the flooded Hyrule called the Great Sea on board Tetra's pirate ship. Along the way, the pair discover the Ghost Ship and Tetra enters it; however, immediately after entering the Ghost Ship, she screams for help. While Link attempts to follow her, he slips and falls into the ocean. Washed ashore on an island, Link is awakened by Ciela, a fairy. Exploring the island, Link finds the Phantom Hourglass, filled with the Sands of Hours, and meets an old man named Oshus, who wants to help Link find the Ghost Ship and reunite with Tetra. To aid him in his quest, Link enlists the help of Captain Linebeck and his ship, the S.S. Linebeck, which Link, Ciela, and Linebeck use to visit islands across the Great Sea. While Linebeck was initially reluctant to team up with the two, Ciela makes mention of a huge treasure, prompting him to agree to help them.

After scouring the Great Sea, Link learns that he must use maps and clues hidden in the Temple of the Ocean King to find the Spirits of Courage, Wisdom, and Power, which in turn will help him locate the Ghost Ship. With the help of the Phantom Hourglass, Link finds the Spirits of Wisdom and Power. When Link finds that the Spirit of Courage looks exactly like Ciela, Oshus explains that she is in fact the spirit, after which she and her other half transform into her true form. Now in possession of the three Spirits, Link, along with Ciela and Oshus, locate the Ghost Ship and find Tetra on board, who has been turned to stone. While Link determines how to save Tetra, Oshus reveals that he is the Ocean King and that he and Ciela had to change their appearances to hide from Bellum, a life-eating monster that Link must destroy to save Tetra. Oshus also mentions that Bellum was the one who created the Ghost Ship and turned Tetra into a statue, and that he has taken residence deep in the Temple of the Ocean King. Linebeck quickly readies to abandon their quest, outraged at the lack of treasure to be found. However, his loyalties instantly return when Oshus promises the captain one wish in return for his continued aid.

To defeat Bellum, Link learns that he must forge the Phantom Sword from three unique, "pure" metals located on nearby islands; Crimsonine (Goron Island), Azurine (Isle of Frost) and Aquanine (Isle of Ruins). After collecting and using the metals to forge the Phantom Sword, Link descends to the bottom level of the Temple of the Ocean King to face Bellum. After intense fighting, Link appears to defeat Bellum, and Tetra is freed from stone. After Link and Tetra hurry back to the S.S. Linebeck to find Oshus, Bellum emerges and sinks the ship, capturing Tetra and knocking Link unconscious in the process. Linebeck finally shows some devotion when he fights off Bellum while Link wakes up. Then, Linebeck gets possessed by Bellum, forcing Link to fight him, eventually defeating Bellum for good, saving Tetra and Linebeck, and releasing the sand from the Phantom Hourglass back into the sea. Oshus, now in his true form as a white whale, readies to depart with the three spirits, while Linebeck, surprising everyone, wishes not for treasure but for his ship back, and Tetra and Link teleport back onto Tetra's pirate ship, where its crew tells them that only ten minutes had passed since the pair left the ship, insisting that their journey was a dream. However, Link still possesses the now-empty Phantom Hourglass, and sees Linebeck's ship on the horizon, knowing that his adventure was real.

Development

Development started in May 2004, at which point the game still had gameplay similar to Four Swords Adventures. At a press conference in Japan for the Nintendo DS in October, Shigeru Miyamoto of Nintendo said that they were thinking of bringing Four Swords to the DS, which was later confirmed by Eiji Aonuma at E3 2005. In 2006, Nintendo presented the keynote address at the annual Game Developers Conference, where they also revealed Phantom Hourglass for the first time and presented a demo. Nintendo also revealed that the game would be released in late 2006. For the holiday season, Nintendo launched two special edition Nintendo DS bundles, each in a different color, on November 23, 2007. One of the bundles, the Gold edition, was emblazoned with The Legend of Zeldas signature Triforce logo and sold alongside Phantom Hourglass.

The same development team that worked on Four Swords Adventures also worked on what would become Phantom Hourglass. In the game's first prototype, the action took place in the upper screen while the touchscreen was a flat map that allowed Link to be controlled. However, the developers believed that this interface caused the player to be too disconnected from the game's action, thereby prompting them to switch the two screens. They felt that this interface would appeal to Japanese players, who they said prefer simple interfaces. The developers added a battle mode that was played over Wi-Fi to appeal to American players.

The game takes advantage of the Nintendo DS's stylus in several different ways. The player can draw shapes to open certain doors and plot out the path of ships on the ocean, among other tasks. The device's touchscreen can also be used to direct Link's boomerang. Phantom Hourglass features cel-shaded graphics, similar to that of The Wind Waker, with some influence from Four Swords Adventures. Link and Zelda's appearances in Phantom Hourglass closely resemble those from The Wind Waker.

At E3 2007, Aonuma said that Phantom Hourglass "opened up the [Zelda] series and [gave] a fresh, new control scheme to the aging Zelda formula". He also said that, despite the disappointing sales of The Wind Waker affecting him personally, he still wished to continue the game's style in another Zelda iteration, leading to the inspiration for Phantom Hourglass. Aonuma believed that the game's simple controls, with the help of the Nintendo DS's touchscreen, helped make Phantom Hourglass the first Zelda game to attract casual gamers.

Reception

Phantom Hourglass was released in Japan on June 23, 2007, in the rest of the world in October, and in South Korea on April 3, 2008. The game was considered to have received "universal acclaim", receiving aggregated scores of 90/100 from Metacritic and 88.82% from GameRankings. Praise focused on the game's use of unique Nintendo DS features, while criticism targeted its more casual gameplay compared to the previous games in The Legend of Zelda series. Phantom Hourglass was the best-selling game in its debut month of June 2007 in Japan, selling 302,887 copies. In the United States, Phantom Hourglass was the fifth best-selling game in its debut month of October 2007, selling 262,800 copies. , 4.13 million copies of the game have been sold worldwide, with 910,000 of those copies in Japan.

Computer and Video Games called Phantom Hourglass one of the few "masterpieces" on the Nintendo DS, which made it "worth every penny". Believing that Phantom Hourglass improves on everything that was great about its predecessor, The Wind Waker, GamePro predicted that the sequel would be another successful game in the franchise. Although feeling that the game does not live up to the standards set in Twilight Princess, Game Informer still felt that the adventure is worthy of The Legend of Zelda series, and noted that it "has enough great stuff going for it" for them to consider it one of the year's best video game adventures. GameZone enjoyed the "spectacular blend of touch-screen combat, brilliant puzzles, and Wind Waker beauty" in Phantom Hourglass, calling it a "can't-miss adventure" and one of Nintendo's and the year's best games. Hypers Jonti Davies commended Phantom Hourglass for its "perfect controls and supreme world and dungeon designs", but criticized the game for only giving around 30 hours of gameplay.

Game Revolution appreciated the game's graphics, and noted that it uses the Nintendo DS's features better than any other game for the console. Praising its "innovative" and "fun" control scheme, GameSpot felt that Phantom Hourglass gave a new life to several of the series' age-old concepts. X-Play wrote that Phantom Hourglass definitely felt like a The Legend of Zelda game, calling it another successful video game for the franchise and a "must-have" for anyone that owns a Nintendo DS. The Onions entertainment newspaper The A.V. Club remarked that Phantom Hourglass exploits the Nintendo DS's touchscreen to the fullest extent in an imaginative and genuinely fun way. In a perfect 5-star review, Empire stated that Phantom Hourglass is one of Nintendo's greatest achievements and a contender for the best handheld adventure in console history.

Issues that were mentioned in reviews regarding the game included its more casual gameplay compared to the previous The Legend of Zelda games, which was not well received by some. GameSpy felt that the game was both easy and approachable enough for casual gamers to play, but sufficiently rewarding and challenging to satisfy hardcore fans of The Legend of Zelda series. IGN believed the game to be "more casual than we'd like", but still found it captivating, entertaining, and "a true adventure worthy of the Zelda name", calling it "different, but it's still the real deal". GameTrailers stated that the short dungeon levels and hand-holding exploration are "outright disappointing", but when comparing Phantom Hourglass to the other Nintendo DS games, they conceded that it was still an impressive game, but just a good game when compared to The Legend of Zelda standards. 1UP.com pointed out that the biggest problem with Phantom Hourglass is that it falls back on using innovations from the previous The Legend of Zelda games, rather than including new and original ideas.

Finding it difficult for hardcore gamers to fully enjoy Phantom Hourglass, Nintendo World Report claimed that the game's lack of alternative control schemes was a telling sign that Nintendo did not have The Legend of Zelda fans in mind when creating the game. They still described the game as "decent", but felt that it departs from the rest of the series and that Nintendo should have taken the risk in creating innovations for this game. The American newspaper The New York Times enjoyed Phantom Hourglass for the most part, but complained about the timer in the Temple of the Ocean King as unnecessary and gimmicky, remarking that the game's dungeons are only "fun to go through once, but none of them are fun enough to go through 20 times". They noted that the time spent traveling through dungeons "removed all thoughts of it being perfect".

Several websites named Phantom Hourglass the 2007 DS Game of the Year, including IGN and GameSpy. It was also mentioned in Best of the Year lists from Wired, Time, and Edge. The game received Editor's Choice awards from GameSpot and IGN. It was also named Best Adventure Game by 1UP.com. The game was designated the Best Handheld Game at the 2008 Golden Joystick awards, the 2007 Game Developers Choice Awards, the 2007 GamePro Editors' Choice awards, the 2007 Spike Video Game Awards, and the 2008 Interactive Achievement Awards. At E3 2006, Phantom Hourglass was designated as the Best Nintendo DS Game by GameSpot and the Best Handheld Game at the Game Critics Awards. The game placed 38th in Official Nintendo Magazines 100 Greatest Nintendo Games of All-Time.

Notes

References

External links
 

2007 video games
Video games about curses
Post-apocalyptic video games
Multiplayer online games
Naval video games
Nintendo DS games
Nintendo Entertainment Analysis and Development games
Nintendo Wi-Fi Connection games
Stealth video games
Steampunk video games
Phantom Hourglass
Video games about pirates
Video games developed in Japan
Video games set on fictional islands
Video games with cel-shaded animation
Virtual Console games
Virtual Console games for Wii U
Spike Video Game Award winners
Microphone-controlled computer games